Mushy peas are dried marrowfat peas which are first soaked overnight in water with sodium bicarbonate (baking soda), and then rinsed in fresh water, after which the peas are gathered in a saucepan, covered with water, and brought to a boil, and then simmered until the peas are softened. The mush is seasoned with salt and pepper.

Throughout the British Isles (Northern England and the Midlands in particular) they are a traditional accompaniment to fish and chips. In Northern England they are also commonly served as part of a popular snack called pie and peas (akin to the South Australian pie floater; but instead of the thick pea soup of the floater, in pie and peas it is mushy peas which accompany the meat pie) and are considered to be a part of traditional British cuisine. They are sometimes also packed into a ball, dipped in batter, deep-fried, and served as a pea fritter. Mushy peas can also be bought ready-prepared in tin cans.

Local variants 

In Yorkshire, Nottinghamshire, Derbyshire and parts of Lincolnshire, mushy peas are often served as a snack on their own. In Nottinghamshire they are traditionally accompanied by mint sauce, and sold at open-air events such as fairs or fêtes. In Derbyshire and Nottinghamshire, mushy peas served with chips is called a 'pea mix'. 
 
A variant (particularly popular around Bolton and Bury of Greater Manchester, and Preston, Lancashire) is parched peas – carlin peas (also known as maple peas or black peas) soaked and then boiled slowly for a long time; these peas are traditionally served with vinegar.

Mushy peas have occasionally been referred to as "Yorkshire caviar".

Artificial colouring
Most commercially produced mushy peas contain artificial colourants to make them green; without these the dish would be murky grey.
Traditionally the controversial colourant tartrazine (E102) had been used as one of the colourants; however, as recently as 2019, major manufacturers were using a combination of brilliant blue FCF (E133) and riboflavin (E101).

See also

 Black peas
 Pea soup
 Pease pudding
 List of legume dishes

References 

Australian cuisine
British condiments
Legume dishes
English cuisine
Yorkshire cuisine
Maltese cuisine